Narmina Rzayeva (born 27 May 1992) is an Azerbaijani former footballer who played as a forward. She has officially played for the senior Azerbaijan women's national team.

References

1992 births
Living people
Women's association football forwards
Azerbaijani women's footballers
Azerbaijan women's international footballers
Gintra Universitetas players
Azerbaijani expatriate footballers
Azerbaijani expatriate sportspeople in Lithuania
Expatriate women's footballers in Lithuania